Plecopterodes is an Afrotropical genus of moths of the family Erebidae.

Species
The species include:
 Plecopterodes clytie	Gaede, 1936
 Plecopterodes deprivata Warren, 1914
 Plecopterodes dissidens Gaede, 1914
 Plecopterodes exigua Gaede, 1914
 Plecopterodes gandolfii	Berio, 1939
 Plecopterodes griseicilia	(Hampson, 1910)
 Plecopterodes heterochroa (Hampson, 1910)
 Plecopterodes lutosa (Grünberg, 1910)
 Plecopterodes melliflua (Holland, 1897)	 
 Plecopterodes moderata (Wallengren, 1860)
 Plecopterodes molybdena	Berio, 1954
 Plecopterodes molybdopasta (Hampson, 1910)
 Plecopterodes synethes	Hampson, 1913

References

Natural History Museum Lepidoptera genus database

Catocalinae